Assiginack is a township in the Canadian province of Ontario, located on Manitoulin Island. An Ontario Historical Plaque was built on the grounds of the Assiginack Museum by the province to commemorate the Manitoulin Treaties' role in Ontario's heritage.

Communities
The principal community in the township is Manitowaning. Smaller communities in the township include Bass Creek, Bidwell, Clover Valley, Eagles Nest, Hilly Grove, The Slash, Squirrel Town and Vanzant's Point.

Manitowaning
Manitowaning is the administrative centre of Assiginack township. The town was founded in 1836 as a centre of the island's Aboriginal education. Manitowaning Bay is a natural harbour, and the community has a marina with good docking facilities. From its early history, Manitowaning was a regular port of call for schooners and steamboats from many points on the Great Lakes. Manitowaning was the first and last scheduled stop on Manitoulin Island for the ships of the Owen Sound Transportation Company Limited. The old steamboat wharf is now part of the community's Museum Heritage Complex, home of the SS Norisle. The town is home to the De-ba-jeh-mu-jig Creation Centre. Cardwell Street in Manitowaning continues east of the community, becoming the primary access road to the Wiikwemkoong Unceded Reserve.

Demographics 

See also
 List of municipalities in Ontario
List of townships in Ontario

References

External links

Municipalities in Manitoulin District
Single-tier municipalities in Ontario
Township municipalities in Ontario
1836 establishments in the British Empire